Antonella Palmisano (born 6 August 1991) is an Italian racewalker, 3rd at 2017 World Championships, 4th at 2016 Summer Olympics and 5th at 2015 World Championships  in 20 km race walk and 1st in the same event at the 2020 Summer Olympics.

Biography
She competed in the Women's 20 kilometres walk event at the 2017 World Championships in Athletics in London and in the Women's 20 kilometres walk event at the 2015 World Championships in Athletics in Beijing, China.

Achievements

National titles
She won 9 national championships at senior level.
Italian Athletics Championships
10 km walk road: 2014, 2018, 2020 (3)
20 km walk road: 2014 (1)
Italian Indoor Athletics Championships
3000 metres walk: 2013, 2015, 2017, 2018, 2019 (5)

See also
 Italian all-time lists - 20 km walk
 Italy at the World Athletics Race Walking Team Championships
 Italy at the European Race Walking Team Championships

References

External links
 

Italian female racewalkers
Living people
1991 births
World Athletics Championships athletes for Italy
World Athletics Championships medalists
Athletes (track and field) at the 2016 Summer Olympics
Athletes (track and field) at the 2020 Summer Olympics
Olympic athletes of Italy
Olympic female racewalkers
Athletics competitors of Fiamme Gialle
European Championships (multi-sport event) bronze medalists
European Athletics Championships medalists
Sportspeople from the Province of Taranto
Italian Athletics Championships winners
Medalists at the 2020 Summer Olympics
Olympic gold medalists in athletics (track and field)
Olympic gold medalists for Italy